The DSK Group was a business conglomerate headquartered in Pune, India, having its presence in domains including real estate, automobile, technology, sports, information technology, and education. The Group was founded by Deepak Sakharam Kulkarni, born and studied in Pune, is the Chairman and Managing Director of the Group. The Group was a multi-crore business with a turnover of over INR 4,000 crores. It had operations in India (Pune, Mumbai, Nashik, Bengaluru and Chennai) and the US.

DSK Group had tied up with Liverpool F.C. to set up a full-time coaching academy in Pune. The Group had head office on Jangali Maharaj Road in Shivajinagar in Pune. Deepak Kulkarni and his wife Hemanti were arrested in Delhi by Pune Police Crime branch on 17 Feb 2018 on charges of cheating over 2500 FD Holders to tune of Rs.1250 Crores. Both were imprisoned for personal transfer of money from the group. The prosecution filed a written say in the court of special judge J T Utpat opposing the grant of bail to developer DS Kulkarni and his wife, Hemanti, in a cheating case registered by a depositor in October 2017. The bail plea, along with two others, is posted for hearing on 17 March 2018.In a related development, the developer’s lawyer Chinmay Inamdar moved an application seeking the court’s direction to the superintendent of the Yerawada central jail in Pune to allow Kulkarni to get fresh clothing and home-made food considering the latter’s age (69 years) and health condition. On 15 May 2018, a team led by deputy commissioner of police (economics & cyber) Sudhir Hiremath arrested Dhananjay Pachpor and two of Kulkarni’s relatives identified as Kedar Vanjape and Sai Vanjape. "Pachpor was the COO, while Kedar is the son-in-law of Kulkarni’s brother, Sai is Kedar’s wife," Hiremath said in press note.

List of Companies 
 DSK Developers Ltd., is the flagship company of DSK Group. It is a Real estate company.
 DSK Toyota is the largest distributor of Toyota Cars in India 
 DSK Shivajians F.C. a football club founded in 1987 and dissolved in 2017, was based in Pune, India.
 DSK International campus was established in 2008 to offer educational courses in the field of Animation, and Video Gaming.
 DSK Entertainment is the IP creation and entertainment arm of DSK Group. Its first project Sabrina: Secrets of a Teenage Witch, in association with MoonScoop Group and Archie Comics, won an Emmy Award for Outstanding Achievement in Main Title and Graphic Design.
 DSK Motowheels was established in 2012, a part of DSK group, to enter the niche segment of powerful and aspirational bikes.  It so far has launched a Korean superbike Hyosung and Italian superbike Benelli.

References 

Indian brands
Companies based in Pune
Conglomerate companies of India
Companies with year of establishment missing